William Richard Frisell (born March 18, 1951) is an American jazz guitarist, composer and arranger. Frisell first came to prominence at ECM Records in the 1980s, as both a session player and a leader. He went on to work in a variety of contexts, notably as a participant in the Downtown Scene in New York City, where he formed a long working relationship with composer and saxophonist John Zorn. He was also a longtime member of veteran drummer Paul Motian's groups from the early 1980s until 2011 (upon Motian’s death). Since the late 1990s, Frisell's output as a bandleader has also integrated prominent elements of folk, country, rock ‘n’ roll and Americana. He has six Grammy nominations and one win.

Biography

Early life and career
Frisell was born in Baltimore, Maryland, United States, but spent most of his youth in the Denver, Colorado area. He studied clarinet with Richard Joiner of the Denver Symphony Orchestra as a youth, but by his teens, was more interested in guitar. He graduated from Denver East High School and went to the University of Northern Colorado to study music. At UNC, he took a class taught by guitarist Johnny Smith. However, Frisell later reported the class effectively became private lessons from Smith because the emphasis on music theory "was too much for everyone else—they didn't want to be learning scales and inversions."

His original guitar teacher in the Denver-Aurora metropolitan area was Dale Bruning, with whom Frisell released the 2000 duo album Reunion. After graduating from Northern Colorado, Frisell went to the Berklee College of Music in Boston, where he studied with Jon Damian and Jim Hall.

ECM Records years
Frisell's major break came when guitarist Pat Metheny was unable to make a recording session and recommended Frisell to Paul Motian, who was recording Psalm (1982) for ECM Records. Frisell became ECM's in-house guitar player, and worked on several albums, most notably Jan Garbarek's 1982 Paths, Prints. Frisell's first solo release was In Line, which featured a solo guitar as well as duets with bassist Arild Andersen.

New York City era
In the 1980s, Frisell moved to Hoboken, New Jersey and was active in the New York jazz scene. He forged an early partnership with John Zorn—including as a member of avant-garde jazz band Naked City—and performed or recorded with many others. He also played in Paul Motian's trio, along with saxophonist Joe Lovano.

Frisell organized a regular working group in the mid-1980s consisting of Kermit Driscoll on bass, Joey Baron on drums, and Hank Roberts on cello (later reduced to a trio when Roberts left). For studio projects, this group was regularly joined by other musicians.

Seattle years
In 1988 Frisell left New York City and moved to Seattle, Washington. In the early 1990s Frisell made two of his best-reviewed albums: first, Have a Little Faith, an ambitious survey of Americana of all stripes, from Charles Ives and Aaron Copland (the entirety of Billy the Kid) to John Hiatt (the title song), Bob Dylan ("Just Like a Woman") and Madonna (a lengthy, psychedelic rock-tinged version of "Live to Tell"); and second, This Land, a complementary set of originals. During this time, he performed with many musicians, including up-and-coming performers such as Douglas September on the album 10 Bulls. He also branched out by performing soundtracks to silent films of Buster Keaton with his trio and contributed to Ryuichi Sakamoto's album Heartbeat.

In the mid-1990s, Frisell disbanded his trio. He continued the trend marked by Have a Little Faith by more explicitly incorporating elements of bluegrass and country music into his music. His friendship with Gary Larson led him to provide music for the TV version of The Far Side (released on the album Quartet along with music written for Keaton's Convict 13).  Since 2000, Frisell has lived on Bainbridge Island, Washington, near Seattle.

2000 to present

Several of Frisell's songs, including his recording of "Over the Rainbow" and "Coffaro's Theme," originally composed in 1995 for an Italian movie, La scuola, were featured in the film Finding Forrester in 2000.

In 1999 Frisell was commissioned by the Walker Art Center in Minneapolis, Minnesota, to compose Blues Dream, which he premiered on November 15, 1999. He later recorded the work for a 2001 release on Nonesuch.

Also in 1999, he released The Sweetest Punch, which featured a seven-piece jazz ensemble reworking the tunes written and recorded by Elvis Costello and Burt Bacharach on Painted from Memory.

Between 2003 and 2005, Frisell acted as musical director for Century of Song, a series of concerts at the German Ruhrtriennale  arts festival (produced by Lee Townsend). Frisell invited artists including Rickie Lee Jones, Elvis Costello, Suzanne Vega, Arto Lindsay, Loudon Wainwright III, Vic Chesnutt, Van Dyke Parks, Buddy Miller, Ron Sexsmith and Chip Taylor to perform their favorite songs in new arrangements.

In 2003 Frisell's The Intercontinentals was nominated for a Grammy award; he won the 2005 Grammy Award for Best Contemporary Jazz Album for his album Unspeakable. His 2008 album History, Mystery was nominated for a 2009 Grammy award for Best Jazz Instrumental Album, Individual or Group. Frisell was also a judge for the sixth annual Independent Music Awards to support independent artists careers.

Frisell has united with Matt Chamberlain, Tucker Martine, and Lee Townsend in the Floratone band, and they released an album on Blue Note (2007) featuring guest performances of Viktor Krauss, Ron Miles and Eyvind Kang.

In 2008 Frisell performed as a featured guest on Earth's album The Bees Made Honey in the Lion's Skull.

In 2009 Frisell featured in a duet rendition of Leonard Cohen's "Hallelujah" with singer-songwriter Sam Shrieve. The recording was released on Shrieve's debut album Bittersweet Lullabies.

In 2010 Frisell started working with the Savoy Jazz label and released Beautiful Dreamers in August 2010, then a second release of Sign of Life in April 2011. Also, on January 25, 2011, Frisell and Vinicius Cantuária released Lágrimas Mexicanas on the E1 label.

In June 2011, Frisell, Lee Townsend, and their frequent collaborator, Vinicius Cantuaria, participated in TEDx GoldenGateED's program, "Teaching Compassion" in Oakland, California. Frisell and Cantuaria performed separately, and Townsend assisted with the technical aspects of the event.

In September 2011, Frisell released All We Are Saying, a full-length offering of his interpretations of John Lennon's music. Frisell's quintet includes violinist Jenny Scheinman, pedal steel and acoustic guitarist Greg Leisz, bassist Tony Scherr, and drummer Kenny Wollesen. In 2017, Frisell received an honorary doctorate of music from his alma mater, Berklee College of Music.

In 2021 a video was recorded at the Village Vanguard in New York and was published by Blue Note Records on YouTube.

Discography

Albums

References

External links 

 
 short film portrait and interview on Bill Frisell and his work with ECM Records
 2014 Bill Frisell Interview on Guitar.com

1951 births
Living people
Guitarists from Maryland
Musicians from Baltimore
American jazz guitarists
ECM Records artists
Nonesuch Records artists
Grammy Award winners
20th-century American guitarists
Jazz musicians from Maryland
Naked City (band) members
Gramavision Records artists